The Hwasong-6 is a North Korean tactical ballistic missile. It is derived from the Hwasong-5, itself a derivative of the Soviet R-17 Elbrus. It carries the NATO reporting name Scud.

History
Work on an extended-range version of the Hwasong-5 began in 1988, and with only relatively minor modifications, a new type was produced from 1989, designated Hwasong-6 ("Scud Mod. C" or "Scud-C"). It was first tested in June 1990, and entered full-scale production the same year, or in 1991. It was superseded by the Rodong-1.

Such range is sufficient to strike targets as far away as western Japan. Its dimensions are identical to the original Hwasong-5. Due to difficulties in procuring MAZ-543 TELs, mobile launchers were produced in North Korea. By 1999, North Korea was estimated to have produced 600 to 1,000 Hwasong-6 missiles, of which 25 had been launched in tests, 300 to 500 had been exported, and 300 to 600 were in service with the Korean People's Army.

Variant with terminal maneuverability was tested in May 2017. U.S. intelligence referred to the upgraded missile as the KN-18.

Export

The Hwasong-6 was exported to Iran, where it is designated as the Shahab-2, to Syria, where it is manufactured under licence with Chinese assistance and to Yemen.Myanmar also imported Hwasong-6 ballistic missiles in 2009. About 100 hwasong-6 ballistic missiles were purchased by Vietnam from North Korea in 1995.

See also
 Hwasong-5
 R-11 Zemlya
 R-17 Elbrus
 Scud
 Ghaznavi
 Abdali-I
 Shaheen-I
 J-600T Yıldırım
 SOM
 Bora
 Fateh-313
 Qiam 1
 Al-Hussein
 Nasr
 Zelzal
 Tondar-69
 Burkan-1

References

Ballistic missiles of North Korea
Korea–Soviet Union relations
Tactical ballistic missiles of North Korea
Chemical weapon delivery systems
Military equipment introduced in the 1990s